Antho prima, or Antho (Acarnia) prima also known as the orange fan sponge is a species of sponge belonging to the genus Antho found on the south coast of South Africa and the coast of New Zealand.

Description 
Its surface is fuzzy and may be covered with a slimy mucus. The sponge is fragile and breaks easily.

Distribution 
The orange fan sponge can be found off of the south coast of South Africa and the coast of New Zealand.

References 

Demospongiae
Biodiversity of South Africa
Animals described in 1924
Sponges of New Zealand